The George W. Andrews Federal Building and United States Courthouse is a historic government building in Opelika, Alabama. It was originally built in 1915 as the U.S. Post Office. It reflects a Renaissance Revival exterior and Colonial Revival interior. 

It is named for George W. Andrews, the pro-racial segregation politician from Alabama.

The Opelika Post Office was listed on the National Register of Historic Places in 1976. It currently serves as a courthouse for the United States District Court for the Middle District of Alabama.

See also 
List of United States post offices

References 

Colonial Revival architecture in Alabama
Renaissance Revival architecture in Alabama
Government buildings completed in 1915
National Register of Historic Places in Lee County, Alabama
Opelika